Blackberry pie is a pie composed of blackberry filling, usually in the form of either blackberry jam, actual blackberries themselves, or some combination thereof. Blackberry pie is tart, so it requires more sugar than blueberry pie. Blackberries can be stewed or soaked in water before baking to prevent burning, an issue not present in preparing blueberry pie.

See also
 List of pies, tarts and flans

Notes

Fruit pies
American pies
German pies
British pies